In Marxist philosophy, the term commodity fetishism describes the economic relationships of production and exchange as being social relationships that exist among things (money and merchandise) and not as relationships that exist among people. As a form of reification, commodity fetishism presents economic value as inherent to the commodities, and not as arising from the workforce, from the human relations that produced the commodity, the goods and the services.

In the first chapter of Capital: A Critique of Political Economy (1867), commodity fetishism is used to explain how the social organization of labour manifests in the buying and selling of commodities (goods and services). In the marketplace, social relations among people — who makes what, who works for whom, the production-time for a commodity, etc. — are represented as social relations among objects.

In the process of commercial exchange, commodities appear in a depersonalized form, obscuring the social relations inherent to their production. Marx explained the sociology of commodity fetishism:

Concept of fetishism

The theory of commodity fetishism originated from Karl Marx's references to fetishes and fetishism in his analyses of religious superstition, and in the criticism of the beliefs of political economists. Marx borrowed the concept of "fetishism" from The Cult of Fetish Gods (1760) by Charles de Brosses, which proposed a materialist theory of the origin of religion. Moreover, in the 1840s, the philosophic discussion of fetishism by Auguste Comte, and Ludwig Feuerbach's psychological interpretation of religion also influenced Marx's development of commodity fetishism.

Marx's first mention of fetishism appeared in 1842, in his response to a newspaper article by Karl Heinrich Hermes, which defended Germany on religious grounds. Hermes agreed with the German philosopher Hegel in regarding fetishism as the crudest form of religion. Marx dismissed that argument and Hermes's definition of religion as that which elevates man "above sensuous appetites". Instead, Marx said that fetishism is "the religion of sensuous appetites", and that the fantasy of the appetites tricks the fetish worshipper into believing that an inanimate object will yield its natural character to gratify the desires of the worshipper. Therefore, the crude appetite of the fetish worshipper smashes the fetish when it ceases to be of service.

The next mention of fetishism was in the 1842 Rheinische Zeitung newspaper articles about the "Debates on the Law on Thefts of Wood", wherein Marx spoke of the Spanish fetishism of gold and the German fetishism of wood as commodities:

In the Economic and Philosophic Manuscripts of 1844, Marx spoke of the European fetish of precious-metal money:

In the ethnological notebooks, he commented upon the archaeological reportage of The Origin of Civilization and the Primitive Condition of Man: Mental and Social conditions of Savages (1870), by John Lubbock. In the Outlines of the Critique of Political Economy (Grundrisse, 1859), he criticized the liberal arguments of the French economist Frédéric Bastiat; and about fetishes and fetishism Marx said:

In A Contribution to the Critique of Political Economy (1859), Marx referred to A Discourse on the Rise, Progress, Peculiar Objects, and Importance of Political Economy (1825), by John Ramsay McCulloch, who said that "In its natural state, matter ... is always destitute of value", with which Marx concurred, saying that "this shows how high even a McCulloch stands above the fetishism of German 'thinkers' who assert that 'material', and half a dozen similar irrelevancies are elements of value".

Furthermore, in the manuscript of "Results of the Immediate Process of Production" (c. 1864), an appendix to Capital: Critique of Political Economy, Volume 1 (1867), Marx said that:

Hence did Karl Marx apply the concepts of fetish and fetishism, derived from economic and ethnologic studies, to the development of the theory of commodity fetishism, wherein an economic abstraction (value) is psychologically transformed (reified) into an object, which people choose to believe has an intrinsic value, in and of itself.

Critique

In the critique of political economy
Marx proposed that in a society where independent, private producers trade their products with each other, of their own volition and initiative, and without much coordination of market exchange, the volumes of production and commercial activities are adjusted in accordance with the fluctuating values of the products (goods and services) as they are bought and sold, and in accordance with the fluctuations of supply and demand. Because their social coexistence, and its meaning, is expressed through market exchange (trade and transaction), people have no other relations with each other. Therefore, social relations are continually mediated and expressed with objects (commodities and money). How the traded commodities relate will depend upon the costs of production, which are reducible to quantities of human labour, although the worker has no control over what happens to the commodities that they produce. (See: Entfremdung, Marx's theory of alienation)

Domination of things
The concept of the intrinsic value of commodities (goods and services) determines and dominates the economic (business) relationships among people, to the extent that buyers and sellers continually adjust their beliefs (financial expectations) about the value of things—either consciously or unconsciously—to the proportionate price changes (market-value) of the commodities over which buyers and sellers believe they have no true control. That psychologic perception transforms the trading-value of a commodity into an independent entity (an object), to the degree that the social value of the goods and services appears to be a natural property of the commodity itself. Thence objectified, the market appears as if self-regulated (by fluctuating supply and demand) because, in pursuit of profit, the consumers of the products ceased to perceive the human co-operation among capitalists that is the true engine of the market where commodities are bought and sold; such is the domination of things in the market.

Objectified value
The value of a commodity originates from the human being's intellectual and perceptual capacity to consciously (subjectively) ascribe a relative value (importance) to a commodity, the goods and services manufactured by the labour of a worker. Therefore, in the course of the economic transactions (buying and selling) that constitute market exchange, people ascribe subjective values to the commodities (goods and services), which the buyers and the sellers then perceive as objective values, the market-exchange prices that people will pay for the commodities.

Naturalization of market behaviour
In a capitalist society, the human perception that "the market" is an independent, sentient entity, is how buyers, sellers, and producers naturalize market exchange (the human choices and decisions that constitute commerce)  as a series of "natural phenomena ... that ... happen of their own accord". Such were the political-economy arguments of the economists whom Karl Marx criticized when they spoke of the "natural equilibria" of markets, as if the price (value) of a commodity were independent of the volition and initiative of the capitalist producers, buyers, and sellers of commodities.

In the 18th century, the Scottish social philosopher and political economist Adam Smith, in The Wealth of Nations (1776) proposed that the "truck, barter, and exchange" activities of the market were corresponding economic representations of human nature, that is, the buying and selling of commodities were activities intrinsic to the market, and thus are the "natural behaviour" of the market. Hence, Smith proposed that a market economy was a self-regulating entity that "naturally" tended towards economic equilibrium, wherein the relative prices (the value) of a commodity ensured that the buyers and sellers obtained what they wanted for and from their goods and services.

In the 19th century, Karl Marx contradicted the artifice of Adam Smith's "naturalisation of the market's behaviour" as a politico-ideologic apology—by and for the capitalists—which allowed human economic choices and decisions to be misrepresented as fixed "facts of life", rather than as the human actions that resulted from the will of the producers, the buyers, and the sellers of the commodities traded at market. Such "immutable economic laws" are what Capital: Critique of Political Economy (1867) revealed about the functioning of the capitalist mode of production, how goods and services (commodities) are circulated among a society; and thus explain the psychological phenomenon of commodity fetishism, which ascribes an independent, objective value and reality to a thing that has no inherent value—other than the value given to it by the producer, the seller, and the buyer of the commodity.

Masking
In a capitalist economy, a character mask (Charaktermaske) is the functional role with which a person relates and is related to in a society composed of stratified social classes, especially in relationships and market-exchange transactions; thus, in the course of buying and selling, the commodities (goods and services) usually appear other than they are, because they are masked (obscured) by the role-playing of the buyer and the seller. Moreover, because the capitalist economy of a class society is an intrinsically contradictory system, the masking of the true socio-economic character of the transaction is an integral feature of its function and operation as market exchange. In the course of business competition among themselves, buyers, sellers, and producers cannot do business (compete) without obscurity—confidentiality and secrecy—thus the necessity of the character masks that obscure true economic motive.

Central to the Marxist critique of political economy is the obscurantism of the juridical labour contract, between the worker and the capitalist, that masks the true, exploitive nature of their economic relationship—that the worker does not sell his and her labour, but that the worker sells individual labour power, the human capacity to perform work and manufacture commodities (goods and services) that yield a profit to the producer. The work contract is the mask that obscures the economic exploitation of the difference between the wages paid for the labour of the worker, and the new value created by the labour of the worker.

Marx thus established that in a capitalist society the creation of wealth is based upon "the paid and unpaid portions of labour [that] are inseparably mixed up with each other, and the nature of the whole transaction is completely masked by the intervention of a contract, and the pay received at the end of the week"; and that:

Opacity of economic relations
The primary valuation of the trading-value of goods and services (commodities) is expressed as money-prices. The buyers and the sellers determine and establish the economic and financial relationships; and afterwards compare the prices in and the price trends of the market. Moreover, because of the masking of true economic motive, neither the buyer, nor the seller, nor the producer perceive and understand every human labour-activity required to deliver the commodities (goods and services), nor do they perceive the workers whose labour facilitated the purchase of commodities. The economic results of such collective human labour are expressed as the values and the prices of the commodities; the value-relations between the amount of human labour and the value of the supplied commodity.

Capitalism as religion
In the essay "Capitalism as Religion" (1921), Walter Benjamin said that whether or not people treat capitalism as a religion was a moot subject, because "One can behold in capitalism a religion, that is to say, capitalism essentially serves to satisfy the same worries, anguish, and disquiet formerly answered by so-called religion." That the religion of capitalism is manifest in four tenets:
(i) "Capitalism is a purely cultic religion, perhaps the most extreme that ever existed"
(ii) "The permanence of the cult"
(iii) "Capitalism is probably the first instance of a cult that creates guilt, not atonement"
(iv) "God must be hidden from it, and may be addressed only when guilt is at its zenith".

Applications

Cultural theory

Since the 19th century, when Karl Marx presented the theory of commodity fetishism, in Section 4, "The Fetishism of Commodities and the Secret thereof", of the first chapter of Capital: Critique of Political Economy (1867), the constituent concepts of the theory, and their sociologic and economic explanations, have proved intellectually fertile propositions that permit the application of the theory (interpretation, development, adaptation) to the study, examination, and analysis of other cultural aspects of the political economy of capitalism, such as:

Sublimated sexuality
The theory of sexual fetishism, which Alfred Binet presented in the essay Le fétichisme dans l'amour: la vie psychique des micro-organismes, l'intensité des images mentales, etc.  (Fetishism in Love: the Psychic Life of Micro-organisms, the Intensity of Mental Images, etc., 1887), was applied to interpret commodity fetishism as types of sexually-charged economic relationships, between a person and a commodity (goods and services), as in the case of advertising, which is a commercial enterprise that ascribes human qualities (values) to a commodity, to persuade the buyer to purchase the advertised goods and services. However, Marx focused on the exchange value of the commodity -- its price -- when considering commodity fetishism and its hiding of the complex social relationships involved in producing and exchanging a product under capitalism. He was not discussing the symbolic meanings of the commodity for the consumer, or what he called its "use value." Hence, sexual fetishism and commodity fetishism are largely unconnected concepts.

Social prestige
In the 19th and in the 21st centuries, Thorstein Veblen (The Theory of the Leisure Class: An Economic Study of Institutions, 1899) and Alain de Botton (Status Anxiety, 2004) respectively developed the social status (prestige) relationship between the producer of consumer goods and the aspirations to prestige of the consumer. To avoid the status anxiety of not being of or belonging to "the right social class", the consumer establishes a personal identity (social, economic, cultural) that is defined and expressed by the commodities (goods and services) that they buy, own, and use; the domination of things that communicate the "correct signals" of social prestige, of belonging. (See: Conspicuous consumption.)

Reification
In History and Class Consciousness (1923), György Lukács started from the theory of commodity fetishism for his development of reification (the psychological transformation of an abstraction into a concrete object) as the principal obstacle to class consciousness. About which Lukács said: "Just as the capitalist system continuously produces and reproduces itself economically on higher levels, the structure of reification progressively sinks more deeply, more fatefully, and more definitively into the consciousness of Man"—hence, commodification pervaded every conscious human activity, as the growth of capitalism commodified every sphere of human activity into a product that can be bought and sold in the market. (See: Verdinglichung, Marx's theory of reification.)

Industrialized culture
Commodity fetishism is theoretically central to the Frankfurt School philosophy, especially in the work of the sociologist Theodor W. Adorno, which describes how the forms of commerce invade the human psyche; how commerce casts a person into a role not of his or her making; and how commercial forces affect the development of the psyche. In the book Dialectic of Enlightenment (1944), Adorno and Max Horkheimer presented the Theory of the Culture Industry to describe how the human imagination (artistic, spiritual, intellectual activity) becomes commodified when subordinated to the "natural commercial laws" of the market.

To the consumer, the cultural goods and services sold in the market appear to offer the promise of a richly developed and creative individuality, yet the inherent commodification severely restricts and stunts the human psyche, so that the man and the woman consumer has little "time for myself", because of the continual personification of cultural roles over which he and she exercise little control. In personifying such cultural identities, the person is a passive consumer, not the active creator, of his or her life; the promised life of individualistic creativity is incompatible with the collectivist, commercial norms of bourgeois culture.

Commodity narcissism
In the study From Commodity Fetishism to Commodity Narcissism (2012) the investigators applied the Marxist theory of commodity fetishism to psychologically analyse the economic behaviour (buying and selling) of the contemporary consumer. With the concept of commodity narcissism, the psychologists Stephen Dunne and Robert Cluley proposed that consumers who claim to be ethically concerned about the manufacturing origin of commodities, nonetheless behaved as if ignorant of the exploitative labour conditions under which the workers produced the goods and services, bought by the "concerned consumer"; that, within the culture of consumerism, narcissistic men and women have established shopping (economic consumption) as a socially acceptable way to express aggression. Researchers find no evidence that a greater manufacturing base can spur economic growth, while improving government effectiveness and regulation quality are more promising for facilitating economic growth.

Ethical Consumption 
Environmentally “conscious” consumers want their purchased products to be environmentally ethical. According to James G. Carrier, on a personal level their purchases can make them feel more positively moral and second they can help put pressure on firms in a competitive market to change the way they do things. Marx’s 1867 notion of commodity fetishism which concerns the idea that ethical consumption is going beyond the two reasons first noted by Carrier. Certain commodities are perceived in a particular way that the consumer ignores or denies the labour time entailed in the process of production or for that matter any detailed background people and process that is viable in creating an ethical product. Capitalists have the intention of selling to an audience with commercial gain - the use of nature as a strategy is vital in urging people to buy their product. Ethical consumption is mostly concerned with the social, political and environmental context of objects - and consumers want a product that meets their moral criteria, something non-exploitative. These baseline concepts need to be visible and eye-catching with recognisable verifications. This is very common in ecotourism who produce eco-friendliness as a reason to buy and visit. Advertising protection and conservation attracts visitors and media attention. These capitalists make no point to vary in their images and photographs or captions - the repetition of nature is always colourful and vibrant, gentle and reserved. They are "fetishizing" nature as a marketing technique. Portraying themselves as a business that protects nature satisfies their clientele so that the consumer cannot see the objects and mechanisms used to actually produce it. Carrier describes how the environment itself is fetishised as a consumable product through parks and other areas of land being used as bodies or images attached to promises of natural experiences or protection efforts in return for money. Carrier also offers the example of fair-trade coffee as a way that commodity fetishism is seen in ethical consumption. If fair-trade coffee promises that it is direct, cooperative supply chain between growers and consumers through images of coffee growers and messaging on the bag of coffee, this becomes more relevant to consumer decision making than the reality that many other “middle-men” were needing in the roasting, packaging, marketing, and transportation of that commodity.

Social alienation 

In The Society of the Spectacle (1967), Guy Debord presented the theory of "le spectacle"—the systematic conflation of advanced capitalism, the mass communications media, and a government amenable to exploiting those factors. The spectacle transforms human relations into objectified relations among images, and vice versa; the exemplar spectacle is television, the communications medium wherein people passively allow (cultural) representations of themselves to become the active agents of their beliefs. The spectacle is the form that society assumes when the Arts, the instruments of cultural production, have been commodified as commercial activities that render an aesthetic value into a commercial value (a commodity). Whereby artistic expression then is shaped by the person's ability to sell it as a commodity, that is, as artistic goods and services.

Capitalism reorganizes personal consumption to conform to the commercial principles of market exchange; commodity fetishism transforms a cultural commodity into a product with an economic "life of its own" that is independent of the volition and initiative of the artist, the producer of the commodity. What Karl Marx critically anticipated in the 19th century, with "The Fetishism of Commodities and the Secret thereof", Guy Debord interpreted and developed for the 20th century—that in modern society, the psychologic intimacies of intersubjectivity and personal self-relation are commodified into discrete "experiences" that can be bought and sold. The Society of the Spectacle is the ultimate form of social alienation that occurs when a person views his or her being (self) as a commodity that can be bought and sold, because they regard every human relation as a (potential) business transaction. (See: Entfremdung, Marx's theory of alienation)

Semiotic sign
Jean Baudrillard applied commodity fetishism to explain the subjective feelings of men and women towards consumer goods in the "realm of circulation"; that is, the cultural mystique (mystification) that advertising ascribed to the commodities (goods and services) in order to encourage the buyer to purchase the goods and services as aids to the construction of his and her cultural identity. In the book For a Critique of the Political Economy of the Sign (1972), Baudrillard developed the semiotic theory of "the Sign" (sign value) as a development of Marx's theory of commodity fetishism and of the exchange value vs. use value dichotomy of capitalism.

Intellectual property
In the 21st century, the political economy of capitalism reified the abstract objects that are information and knowledge into the tangible commodities of intellectual property, which are produced by and derived from the labours of the intellectual and the white collar workers.

Philosophic base
The economist Michael Perelman critically examined the belief systems from which arose intellectual property rights, the field of law that commodified knowledge and information. Samuel Bowles and Herbert Gintis critically reviewed the belief systems of the theory of human capital.  Knowledge, as the philosophic means to a better life, is contrasted with capitalist knowledge (as commodity and capital), produced to generate income and profit. Such commodification detaches knowledge and information from the (user) person, because, as intellectual property, they are independent, economic entities.

Knowledge: authentic and counterfeit
In Postmodernism, or, the Cultural Logic of Late Capitalism (1991), the Marxist theorist Fredric Jameson linked the reification of information and knowledge to the post-modern distinction between authentic knowledge (experience) and counterfeit knowledge (vicarious experience),  which usually is acquired through the mass communications media. In Critique of Commodity Aesthetics: Appearance, Sexuality and Advertising in Capitalist Society (1986), the philosopher Wolfgang Fritz Haug presents a "critique of commodity aesthetics" that examines how human needs and desires are manipulated and reshaped for commercial gain.

Financial risk management
The sociologists Frank Furedi and Ulrich Beck studied the development of commodified types of knowledge in the business culture of "risk prevention" in the management of money. The Post–World War II economic expansion (c. 1945–1973) created very much money (capital and savings), while the dominant bourgeois ideology of money favoured the risk-management philosophy of the managers of investment funds and financial assets. From such administration of investment money, manipulated to create new capital, arose the preoccupation with risk calculations, which subsequently was followed by the "economic science" of risk prevention management. In light of which, the commodification of money as "financial investment funds" allows an ordinary person to pose as a rich person, as an economic risk-taker able to risk losing money invested to the market. Hence, the fetishization of financial risk as "a sum of money" is a reification that distorts the social perception of the true nature of financial risk, as experienced by ordinary people. Moreover, the valuation of financial risk is susceptible to ideological bias; that contemporary fortunes are achieved from the insight of experts in financial management, who study the relationship between "known" and "unknown" economic factors, by which human fears about money can be manipulated and exploited.

Commodified art
The cultural critics Georg Simmel and Walter Benjamin examined and described the fetishes and fetishism of Art, by means of which "artistic" commodities are produced for sale in the market, and how commodification determines and establishes the value of the artistic commodities (goods and services) derived from legitimate Art; for example, the selling of an artist's personal effects as "artistic fetishes".

Legal traducement
In the field of law, the scholar Evgeny Pashukanis (The General Theory of Law and Marxism, 1924), the Austrian politician Karl Renner, the German political scientist Franz Leopold Neumann, the British socialist writer China Miéville, the labour-law attorney Marc Linder, and the American legal philosopher Duncan Kennedy (The Role of Law in Economic Theory: Essays on the Fetishism of Commodities, 1985) have respectively explored the applications of commodity fetishism in their contemporary legal systems, and reported that the reification of legal forms misrepresents social relations.

Criticism

In Portrait of a Marxist as a Young Nun (1988), Professor Helena Sheehan said that the analogy between religious faith and commodity fetishism is a mistaken interpretation, because people do not worship commodities (money and merchandise) by attributing supernatural powers to inanimate objects, to a fetish. That the belief that value-relationships inherent to a commodity described is not religious belief, because value-relations do not possess the psychological characteristics of spiritual beliefs. That interpretation is proved by the possibility of a person's possessing religious faith, whilst being aware of the psychology of commodity fetishism, and thus being critical of the fetishization of money and merchandise, thus, a person's disbelief in the Golden Calf is integral to the person's iconoclasm against the idolatry of money.

See also
 Pre-Marxist theories
 Simple living
 Marxist theories pertinent to the theory of commodity fetishism

 Post-Marxist theories derived from the theory of commodity fetishism
 Essays of Marx's Theory of Value by Isaak Illich Rubin
 History and Class Consciousness, "Reification and the Consciousness of the Proletariat" (theories of class consciousness and of reification) by Geörg Lukács
 The Society of the Spectacle by Guy Debord (full text)
 The System of Objects by Jean Baudrillard
Neomaterialism by Joshua Simon
Time, Labor and Social Domination by Moishe Postone
Value criticism (in German Wertkritik)

References

Further reading

External links

 Capital, Chapter 1, Section 4 – The Fetishism of Commodities and the Secret Thereof
 All of Chapter One – Marx's logical presentation 
 (Isaac Rubin's commentary on Marx)
 "The Reality behind Commodity Fetishism"
 David Harvey, Reading Marx's Capital, Reading Marx's Capital – Class 2, Chapters 1–2, The Commodity (video lecture)
 Biene Baumeister,Die Marxsche Kritik des Fetischismus (outline in German)
 Understanding Capitalism Part IV: Capitalism, Culture and Society

Marxist terminology
Marxian economics
Marxian critique of political economy